Thryptomene hexandra, commonly known as Palm Valley myrtle in the Northern Territory, is a species of flowering plant in the family Myrtaceae and is endemic to north-eastern Australia. It is an erect, much-branched shrub with linear to lance-shaped leaves and white flowers with six stamens.

Description
The flowers have six, more or less round white sepals and petals and six stamens. Flowering occurs in most months, but especially from June to September.

Taxonomy and naming
Thryptomene hexandra was first formally described in 1944 by Cyril Tenison White in Proceedings of the Royal Society of Queensland. The specific epithet (hexandra) means "six stamens".

Distribution and habitat
This thryptomene occurs in New South Wales, Queensland and the Northern Territory. It grows in woodland on stony hills north from Bourke in New South Wales and in deep, narrow gorges in the southern part of the Northern Territory.

Conservation status
This species is listed as "vulnerable " under the Australian Government Environment Protection and Biodiversity Conservation Act 1999 and as "near threatened" under the Northern Territory Government Territory Parks and Wildlife Conservation Act 1976, but as of "least concern" under the Queensland Government Nature Conservation Act 1992.

References

hexandra
Flora of New South Wales
Flora of Queensland
Flora of the Northern Territory
Plants described in 1944
Taxa named by Cyril Tenison White